Groesbeck is a census-designated place (CDP) in Hamilton County, Ohio, United States. The population was 7,365 at the 2020 census. It is a suburb of Cincinnati.

History
Groesbeck was founded as West Union. When the community established a post office in 1857 it was discovered there was already a West Union in Ohio and so the name was changed. William S. Groesbeck was a United States Representative from Ohio.

In 1894, Groesbeck was described as having two hotels, a blacksmith shop, and a church.

Geography
Groesbeck is located at  (39.228645, -84.594221).

Demographics

As of the census of 2000, there were 7,202 people, 2,771 households, and 1,986 families residing in the CDP. The population density was 2,451.1 people per square mile (945.8/km2). There were 2,857 housing units at an average density of 972.3/sq mi (375.2/km2). The racial makeup of the CDP was 91.92% White, 5.67% African American, 0.07% Native American, 0.67% Asian, 0.03% Pacific Islander, 0.33% from other races, and 1.32% from two or more races. Hispanic or Latino of any race were 0.60% of the population.

There were 2,771 households, out of which 36.1% had children under the age of 18 living with them, 56.0% were married couples living together, 11.7% had a female householder with no husband present, and 28.3% were non-families. 24.5% of all households were made up of individuals, and 11.2% had someone living alone who was 65 years of age or older. The average household size was 2.60 and the average family size was 3.11.

In the CDP, the population was spread out, with 27.7% under the age of 18, 8.1% from 18 to 24, 29.0% from 25 to 44, 20.0% from 45 to 64, and 15.3% who were 65 years of age or older. The median age was 36 years. For every 100 females, there were 96.0 males. For every 100 females age 18 and over, there were 88.0 males.

The median income for a household in the CDP was $49,253, and the median income for a family was $56,843. Males had a median income of $40,323 versus $27,825 for females. The per capita income for the CDP was $21,525. About 4.9% of families and 5.6% of the population were below the poverty line, including 5.8% of those under age 18 and 6.8% of those age 65 or over.

Community
In November 2007, BusinessWeek.com listed Groesbeck first in a list of the 50 best places to raise children. The rankings were based on five factors, including school test scores, cost of living, recreational and cultural activities, number of schools and risk of crime.

References

Census-designated places in Hamilton County, Ohio
Census-designated places in Ohio
1857 establishments in Ohio